Helga Henselder-Barzel (1940 – 15 December 1995) was a German political scientist. She was the president of the German non-governmental organization Welthungerhilfe from 1984 until her death in 1995. In that capacity she critiqued contemporary public policy in Germany, particularly advocating for increased poverty reduction efforts and aid to with women in developing countries.

In 1971, Henselder-Barzel published the book Marokko zwischen Demokratie und Diktatur (Morocco between democracy and dictatorship).

In 1993, she was awarded the Order of Merit of the Federal Republic of Germany.

She married Rainer Barzel in 1982, shortly before he became President of the Bundestag. Her grandfather was the automobile pioneer August Horch.

Selected works
Marokko zwischen Demokratie und Diktatur (1971)

Selected awards
Order of Merit of the Federal Republic of Germany (1993)

References

1940 births
1995 deaths
Commanders Crosses of the Order of Merit of the Federal Republic of Germany
German political scientists
Women political scientists
20th-century political scientists